Pál Nagy may refer to:

 Pál B. Nagy (born 1935), Hungarian fencer who won a gold medal at the 1968 Summer Olympics
 Felsőbüki Nagy Pál (1777–1857), liberal Hungarian politician